Clube Esportivo e Recreativo Atlântico, is a Brazilian sports club based in Erechim, that is best known for its futsal team. It has won one Intercontinental Futsal Cup and one Copa Libertadores.

Club honours

National competitions
 Taça Brasil de Futsal: 2013, 2019
 Superliga de Futsal: 2013
 Copa Cataratas de Futsal: 2014

Regional competitions
 Copa Max Internacional de Futsal: 2003
 Torneio Brejeiros da Madrugada (2): 2013, 2014
 Copa Sul de Futsal: 2004
 Liga Sul de Futsal: 2013

State competitions
 Campeonato Gaúcho de Futsal (4): 2011, 2014, 2016, 2021
 Liga Gaúcha de Futsal: 2019

International competitions
 Intercontinental Futsal Cup: 2015
 Copa Libertadores de Futsal: 2014

Current squad

References

External links
 Atlântico official website
 Atlântico LNF profile
 Atlântico in zerozero.pt

Sports clubs established in 1915
1915 establishments in Brazil
Futsal clubs in Brazil
Sports teams in Rio Grande do Sul